Petr Ulrych (born 6 June 1987) is a Czech professional ice hockey player who currently plays professionally in Slovakia for HK Dukla Trenčín of the Slovak Extraliga.

Career
Ulrych made his Czech Extraliga debut playing with HC Bílí Tygři Liberec during the 2010–11 Czech Extraliga season.

Career statistics

Regular season and playoffs

References

External links

 

1987 births
Living people
Czech ice hockey defencemen
HC Bílí Tygři Liberec players
HC Benátky nad Jizerou players
Rytíři Kladno players
HC Dukla Jihlava players
HKM Zvolen players
HK Poprad players
HK Dukla Trenčín players
Sportspeople from Liberec
Czech expatriate ice hockey players in Slovakia